Merritt-Winstead House is a historic home located near Roxboro, Person County, North Carolina. It was built in 1915, as a -story, transitional Queen Anne / Colonial Revival style frame dwelling. It was enlarged in 1934 to a two-story, three bay, Colonial Revival dwelling veneered in brick with a one-story, wrap-around American Craftsman-style front porch. A one-story vestibule was added to the front facade about 1950. Also on the property are a contributing carport (c. 1950), garage (c. 1934), tennis court (c. 1925), swimming pool complex (c. 1952), well house (c. 1950), two grape arbors (c. 1930–1935), Bill Joe's Play Doctor's Office (c. 1928), retaining walls (c. 1952), storage building (c. 1934), barbeque grill (c. 1952), and rock walls and a boxwood garden (c. 1925).

The house was added to the National Register of Historic Places in 2005.

References

Houses on the National Register of Historic Places in North Carolina
Queen Anne architecture in North Carolina
Colonial Revival architecture in North Carolina
Houses completed in 1934
Houses in Person County, North Carolina
National Register of Historic Places in Person County, North Carolina
1934 establishments in North Carolina